The Oman participated in the 2010 Summer Youth Olympics in Singapore.

Medalists

Athletics

Note: The athletes who do not have a "Q" next to their Qualification Rank advance to a non-medal ranking final.

Girls
Track and Road Events

Equestrian

References

2010 in Omani sport
Oman at the Youth Olympics